Jewel Song may refer to:

"Ah! Je ris de me voir", from Charles Gounod's opera Faust "Air de bijoux"
Alternative name for Facing the Music (1933 film), 1933 British musical comedy film